Rosemont is a residential neighbourhood in the northwest quadrant of Calgary, Alberta. It is bounded by Northmount Drive to the north, by Cambrian Drive to the east, by 23 Avenue N and the Confederation Park to the south and by 14 Street W to the west.

The lands were annexed to the City of Calgary in 1910, and the neighbourhood was established in 1958. It is represented in the Calgary City Council by the Ward 7 councillor.

Demographics

Residents in this community had a median household income of $53,027 in 2000, and there were 11.3% low income residents living in the neighbourhood. As of 2000, 13.4% of the residents were immigrants. A proportion of 18.6% of the buildings were condominiums or apartments, and 29.9% of the housing was used for renting.

Education
The community is served by the Rosemont Elementary public school.

See also
List of neighbourhoods in Calgary

References

External links
Rosemont Community Association

Neighbourhoods in Calgary